The following ships of the Indian Navy have been named INS Shardul:

  is the lead ship of her class of amphibious warfare vessels, currently in active service

Indian Navy ship names